Lisa Telford (born in Ketchikan, Alaska) is a Git'ans Git'anee Haida weaver who creates contemporary garments, shoes and other objects using Northwest Coast style weaving techniques. Her work serves as a commentary on Native identity, stereotypes and fashion.

Her baskets may be seen in the collections of The Oregon Historical Society, Hallie Ford Museum of Art, the Smithsonian National Museum of the American Indian, the Heard Museum, the Portland Art Museum, the Burke Museum and at Stonington Gallery.

Training 
Telford comes from a long line of weavers including her grandmother, mother, aunt and cousins. Despite her Indiana upbringing, she grew up connected to her culture, visiting Alaska for traditional gatherings and potlatches and participating in traditional dance.

For 16 years Telford worked as a carpenter. In 1996, she took a position as a job developer with a nonprofit organization called ANEW — Apprenticeship and Nontraditional Employment for Women and Men.

At the age of 35, she began learning to weave traditional Haida baskets from her aunt, Delores Churchill, and traditional cedar garments from her cousin, Holly Churchill.

Creative process 
Telford stuck strictly to the tradition of form follows function until 2004 when she went into contemporary cedar clothing, cedar shoes, cowboy boots and neckties.

Telford tells of her work:

I harvest and prepare my own material, using red & yellow cedar bark and spruce root in my work. Harvesting cedar bark takes me hundreds of miles from home and many hours of preparation time. Materials are prepared differently depending on the final product. The bark is traditionally stored for one year and then further processing is required before weaving may start.

After that, baskets can take Telford five to 200 hours to make.

As a young weaver she once sat down and counted every stitch on one of her grandmother's old baskets. "At first my basketry had to be perfect, and then I let it all go and that's when I found true joy". The artist compares making baskets to therapy, saying it helps her relax from the stresses of life. She also called basketry her thread to sanity.

Collaborations 

In 2011, Telford worked with glass artist Preston Singletary on an exhibition of women's forms in glass.

In 2011, Telford received in the National Native Artist Exchange Grant to work with Kelly Church. She taught Kelly how to find and choose the proper cedar tree for harvesting, how to split and prepare the bark to be stored.

Exhibitions 
Hearts of Our People: Native Women Artists, June 2019 -September 2020, organized by the Minneapolis Institute of Art, Minneapolis, MN

Grants, honors, and awards 
 1998 - demonstrator at the Suquamish Museum and the Seattle Art Museum
 1998 - instructor at the Sealaska Heritage Foundation
 1998 - instructor at the Kootznoowoo Cultural Foundation
 1999 - artist in residence at Eitejorg Museum in Indianapolis
 1999 - artist in residence at the National Museum of the American Indian/Smithsonian Institution
 1999 - artist in residence at the ATLATL in New York
 2006 - visiting-researcher at the Burke Museum's Bill Holm Center for the Study of Northwest Coast Art
 2011 -  received an Artistic Innovation grant from the Native Arts and Cultures Foundation
 2011 - her work was chosen selected as the catalog cover image for "Time Warp: Contemporary Textiles of the Northwest Coast," at the Bill Reid Gallery of Northwest Coast Art
 2012 - won first place at the 53rd annual Indian Fair & Market at the Heard Museum

References 

Living people
20th-century Native Americans
21st-century Native Americans
Artists from Alaska
People from Ketchikan, Alaska
Native American basket weavers
Haida artists
American textile artists
Native American women artists
Women basketweavers
Women textile artists
Year of birth missing (living people)
20th-century Native American women
21st-century Native American women